The University of Maryland, College Park (University of Maryland, UMD, or simply Maryland) is a public land-grant research university in College Park, Maryland. Founded in 1856, UMD is the flagship institution of the University System of Maryland. It is also the largest university in both the state and the Washington metropolitan area, with more than 41,000 students representing all fifty states and 123 countries, and a global alumni network of over 388,000. Together, its 12 schools and colleges offer over 200 degree-granting programs, including 92 undergraduate majors, 107 master's programs, and 83 doctoral programs. UMD is a member of the Association of American Universities and competes in intercollegiate athletics as a member of the Big Ten Conference.

The University of Maryland's proximity to the nation's capital has resulted in many research partnerships with the federal government; faculty receive research funding and institutional support from many agencies, such as the National Institutes of Health, NASA, the National Institute of Standards and Technology, the Food and Drug Administration, the National Security Agency, and the Department of Homeland Security. It is classified among "R1: Doctoral Universities – Very high research activity" and is labeled a "Public Ivy", denoting a quality of education comparable to the private Ivy League. UMD is ranked among the top 100 universities both nationally and globally by several indices, including its perennially top-ranked criminology and criminal justice department.

In 2016, the University of Maryland, College Park and the University of Maryland, Baltimore formalized their strategic partnership after their collaboration successfully created more innovative medical, scientific, and educational programs, as well as greater research grants and joint faculty appointments than either campus has been able to accomplish on its own. According to the National Science Foundation, the university spent a combined $1.1 billion on research and development in 2020, ranking it 16th overall in the nation and 10th among all public institutions. As of 2021, the operating budget of the University of Maryland is approximately $2.2 billion.

History

Early history

On March 6, 1856, the forerunner of today's University of Maryland was chartered as the Maryland Agricultural College. Two years later, Charles Benedict Calvert (1808–1864), a future U.S. Representative (Congressman) from the sixth congressional district of Maryland, 1861–1863, during the American Civil War and descendant of the first Lord Baltimores, colonial proprietors of the Province of Maryland in 1634, purchased  of the Riversdale Mansion estate nearby today's College Park, Maryland. Later that year, Calvert founded the school and was the acting president from 1859 to 1860. On October 5, 1859, the first 34 students entered the Maryland Agricultural College. The school became a land grant college in February 1864.

Civil War

During the Civil War, Confederate soldiers under Brigadier General Bradley Tyler Johnson moved past the college on July 12, 1864, as part of Jubal Early's raid on Washington, D.C. By the end of the war, financial problems forced the administrators to sell off  of land, and the continuing decline in enrollment sent the Maryland Agricultural College into bankruptcy. The campus was used as a boys' preparatory school for the next two years.

Following the Civil War, in February 1866, the Maryland legislature assumed half ownership of the school. The college thus became, in part, a state institution. By October 1867, the school reopened with 11 students. In 1868, the former Confederate admiral Franklin Buchanan was appointed President of the school. In his tenure of just over a year, he reorganized it, established a system of strict economy in its business transactions, applied some of its revenues for the paying off of its debts, raised its standards, and attracted patrons through his influence: enrollment grew to 80 at the time of his resignation, and the school soon paid off its debt. In 1873, Samuel Jones, a former Confederate Major General, became president of the college.

Twenty years later, the federally-funded Agricultural Experiment Station was established there. During the same period, state laws granted the college regulatory powers in several areas—including controlling farm disease, inspecting feed, establishing a state weather bureau and geological survey, and housing the forestry board. Morrill Hall (the oldest instructional building still in use on campus) was built the following year.

The Great Fire of 1912

On November 29, 1912, a fire destroyed the barracks where the school housed the students, all the school's records, and most of the academic buildings, leaving only Morrill Hall untouched. There were no injuries or fatalities, and all but two students returned to the university and insisted on classes continuing. Students were housed by families in neighboring towns until the school could rebuild the housing, although a new administration building was not built until the 1940s.
A large brick and concrete compass inlaid in the ground designates the former center of campus as it existed in 1912.

Modern history

The state took control of the school in 1916 and renamed it Maryland State College. That year, the first female students enrolled at the school. On April 9, 1920, the college became part of the existing University of Maryland, replacing St. John's College, Annapolis as the university's undergraduate campus. In the same year, the graduate school on the College Park campus awarded its first Ph.D. degrees and the university's enrollment reached 500 students. In 1925 the university was accredited by the Association of American Universities.

By the time the first black students enrolled at the university in 1951, enrollment had grown to nearly 10,000 students—4,000 of whom were women. Prior to 1951, many black students in Maryland were enrolled at the University of Maryland, Eastern Shore.

In 1957, President Wilson H. Elkins pushed to increase the university's academic standards. His efforts resulted in creating one of the first Academic Probation Plans. The first year the plan went into effect, 1,550 students (18% of the total student body) faced expulsion.

On October 19, 1957, Queen Elizabeth II of the United Kingdom attended her first and only college football game at the University of Maryland after expressing interest in seeing a typically American sport during her first tour of the United States. The Maryland Terrapins beat the North Carolina Tar Heels 21 to 7 in the historical game now referred to as "The Queen's Game".

Phi Beta Kappa established a chapter at UMD in 1964. In 1969, the university was elected to the Association of American Universities. The school continued to grow, and by the fall of 1985 reached an enrollment of 38,679. Like many colleges during the Vietnam War, the university was the site of student protests and had curfews enforced by the National Guard.

In a massive restructuring of the state's higher education system in 1988, the school was designated as the flagship campus of the newly formed University of Maryland System (later changed to the University System of Maryland in 1997). It was formally named the University of Maryland, College Park. All five campuses in the former network were designated distinct campuses in the new system. However, in 1997 the Maryland General Assembly passed legislation allowing the University of Maryland, College Park, to be known simply as the University of Maryland, recognizing the campus' role as the flagship institution of the University System of Maryland.

The other University System of Maryland institutions with the name "University of Maryland" are not satellite campuses of the University of Maryland, College Park. The University of Maryland, Baltimore, is the only other school permitted to confer certain degrees from the "University of Maryland".

In 1994, the National Archives at College Park completed construction and opened on a parcel of land adjoining campus donated by the University of Maryland, after lobbying by President William Kirwan and congressional leaders to foster academic collaboration between the institutions.

21st century
In 2004, the university began constructing the  "M Square Research Park," which includes facilities affiliated with the U.S. Department of Defense, Food and Drug Administration, and the new National Center for Weather and Climate Prediction, affiliated with The National Oceanic and Atmospheric Administration (NOAA). In May 2010, ground was broken on a new $128-million,  Physical Science Complex, including an advanced quantum science laboratory.

Wallace Loh became president of the university in 2010.

The university's "Great Expectations" campaign from 2006 to 2012 exceeded $1 billion in private donations.

The university suffered multiple data breaches in 2014. The first resulted in the loss of over 300,000 student and faculty records. A second data breach occurred several months later. The second breach was investigated by the FBI and Secret Service and found to be done by David Helkowski. Despite the attribution, no charges were filed. As a result of the data breaches, the university offered free credit protection for five years to the students and faculty affected.

In 2012, the University of Maryland, College Park and the University of Maryland, Baltimore united under the MPowering the State initiative to leverage the strengths of both institutions. The University of Maryland Strategic Partnership Act of 2016 officially formalized this partnership.

The University of Maryland's University District Plan, developed in 2011 under President Wallace Loh and the College Park City Council, seeks to make the City of College Park a top 20 college town by 2020 by improving housing and development, transportation, public safety, local pre-K–12 education, and supporting sustainability projects. As of 2018, the university is involved with over 30 projects and 1.5 million square feet of development as part of its Greater College Park Initiative, worth over $1 billion in public-private investments. The university's vision is to revitalize the campus to foster a dynamic and innovative academic environment, as well as to collaborate with the surrounding neighborhoods and local government to create a vibrant downtown community for students and faculty.

In October 2017, the university received a record-breaking donation of $219.5 million from the A. James & Alice B. Clark Foundation, ranking among the country's largest philanthropic gifts to a public university.

As of February 12, 2020, it has been announced that Darryll J. Pines will be the 34th President of the University of Maryland College Park, effective July 1, 2020. Darryll J. Pines is the dean of the A. James Clark School of Engineering and the Nariman Farvardin Professor of Aerospace Engineering since January 2009.
Darryll J. Pines has been with the University of Maryland College Park for 25 years since he arrived in 1995 and started as an assistant professor.

In 2021, the university announced it had achieved its record goal of $1.5 billion raised in donations since 2018 as part of its "Fearless Ideas: The Campaign for Maryland" for investments in faculty, students, research, scholarships, and capital projects.

Academics

Profile
As of 2022, The University of Maryland ranked #55 in National Universities and #19 in Top Public Schools in the United States. The University of Maryland offers 127 undergraduate degrees and 112 graduate degrees in thirteen colleges and schools:

 A. James Clark School of Engineering
 College of Agriculture and Natural Resources
 College of Arts and Humanities
 School of Languages, Literatures, and Cultures
 School of Music
 College of Behavioral and Social Sciences
 College of Computer, Mathematical, and Natural Sciences
 College of Education
 College of Information Studies
 Philip Merrill College of Journalism
 Robert H. Smith School of Business
 School of Architecture, Planning & Preservation
 School of Public Health (formerly the College of Health & Human Performance)
 School of Public Policy
 Office of Undergraduate Studies
 The Graduate School

Undergraduate education is centered on both a student's chosen academic program and the selection of core coursework to fulfill general education requirements.

Programs

The university hosts "living-learning" programs that allow students with similar academic interests to live in the same residential community take specialized courses and perform research in those areas of expertise. An example is the Honors College, which is geared towards undergraduate students meeting high academic requirements and consists of several of the university's honors programs. The Honors College welcomes students into a community of faculty and undergraduates. The Honors College offers seven living and learning programs: Advanced Cybersecurity Experience for Students, Design Cultures and Creativity, Entrepreneurship and Innovation, Honors Humanities, Gemstone, Integrated Life Sciences, and University Honors.
 Advanced Cybersecurity Experience for Students (ACES), started in 2013, is directed by Michel Cukier and run by faculty and graduate students. ACES students are housed in Prince Frederick Hall and take a 14-credit, two-year curriculum that educates future leaders in the field of cybersecurity. ACES also offers a complementary two-year minor in cybersecurity.
 Design Cultures and Creativity (DCC), started in 2009, is directed by artist Jason Farman and run by faculty and graduate students. The DCC program encourages students to explore the relationship between emerging media, society, and creative practices. DCC students are housed in Prince Frederick residence hall together and take a 16 credit, two year interdisciplinary curriculum which culminates in a capstone.
 Entrepreneurship and Innovation Program (EIP) is a living and learning program for Honors College first- and second-year students, helping build entrepreneurial mindsets, skill sets, and relationships to develop solutions to today's problems. Through learning, courses, seminars, workshops, competitions, and volunteerism, students receive an education in entrepreneurship and innovation. Collaborating with faculty and mentors who have launched new ventures, all student teams develop an innovative idea and write a product plan.
 Honors Humanities is the honors program for beginning undergraduates interested in the humanities and creative arts. The selective two-year living-learning program combines a small liberal arts college environment with the resources of a large research university.
 Gemstone is a multidisciplinary four-year research program for select undergraduate honors students of all majors. Under the guidance of faculty mentors and Gemstone staff, teams of students design, direct, and conduct research, exploring the interdependence of science and technology with society.
 Integrated Life Sciences (ILS) is the honors program for students interested in all aspects of biological research and biomedicine. The College of Computer, Mathematical, and Natural Sciences has partnered with the Honors College to create the ILS program, which offers nationally recognized innovations in the multidisciplinary training of life science and pre-medical students. The objective of the ILS experience is to prepare students for success in graduate, medical, dental, or other professional schools.
 University Honors (UH) is the largest living-learning program in the Honors College and allows students the greatest independence in shaping their education. University Honors students are placed into a close-knit community of the university's faculty and other undergraduates, committed to acquiring a broad and balanced education. Students choose from over 130 seminars exploring interdisciplinary topics in three broad areas: Contemporary Issues and Challenges, Arts and Sciences in Today's World, and Using the World as a Classroom.
 The College Park Scholars programs are two-year living-learning programs for first- and second-year students. Students are selected to enroll in one of 12 thematic programs: Arts; Business, Society, and the Economy; Environment, Technology, and Economy; Global Public Health; International Studies; Life Sciences; Media, Self, and Society; Public Leadership; Science and Global Change; Science, Discovery, and the Universe; Science, Technology, and Society. Students live in dormitories in the Cambridge Community on North Campus.

The nation's first living-learning entrepreneurship program, Hinman CEOs, is geared toward students who are interested in starting their own business. Students from all academic disciplines live together and are provided the resources to explore business ventures.

The QUEST (Quality Enhancement Systems and Teams) Honors Fellows Program engages undergraduate students from business, engineering, and computer, mathematical, and physical sciences. QUEST Students participate in courses focused on cross-functional collaboration, innovation, quality management, and teamwork. The Department of Civil & Environmental Engineering (CEE) has also been long considered an outstanding engineering division of the university since its inception in 1908.

Other living-learning programs include: CIVICUS, a two-year program in the College of Behavioral and Social Sciences based on the five principles of civil society; Global Communities, a program that immerses students in a diverse culture (students from all over the world live in a community), and the Language House, which allows students pursuing language courses to live and practice with other students learning the same language.

The Mock Trial Team engages in intercollegiate mock trial competition. The team, which first began competing in 1990, has won five national championships (2008, 2000, 1998, 1996, 1992), which ranks the most of any university, and was also the national runner-up in 1992 and 1993.

Faculty

The university's faculty has included four Nobel Prize laureates. The earliest recipient, Juan Ramón Jiménez, was a Spanish language and literature professor and won the 1956 prize for literature. Four decades later, physics professor William Daniel Phillips won the prize in physics for his contributions to laser cooling, a technique to slow the movement of gaseous atoms, in 1997. In 2005, professor emeritus of economics and public policy Thomas Schelling was awarded the prize in economics for his contributions to game theory. In 2006, adjunct professor of physics and senior astrophysicist at NASA John C. Mather was awarded the prize in physics alongside George Smoot for their work in the discovery of blackbody form and anisotropy of the cosmic microwave background radiation. In addition, two University of Maryland alumni are Nobel Prize laureates; Herbert Hauptman won the 1985 prize in chemistry, and Raymond Davis Jr. won the 2002 prize in physics.

The university has many notable academics. Professor of mathematics, Sergei Novikov won the Fields Medal in 1970, followed by alumnus Charles Fefferman in 1978. Alumnus George Dantzig won the 1975 National Medal of Science for his work in the field of linear programming. Professor of physics Michael Fisher won the Wolf Prize in 1980 (together with Kenneth G. Wilson and Leo Kadanoff) and the IUPAP Boltzmann Medal in 1983. James A. Yorke, a Distinguished University Professor of Mathematics and Physics and chair of the Mathematics Department, won the 2003 Japan Prize for his work in chaotic systems. In 2013, professor of Physics Sylvester James Gates was awarded the National Medal of Science.

Research
UMD is classified among "R1: Doctoral Universities – Very high research activity". In FY 2020, the university spent about 1.103 billion dollars in total R&D expenditures, ranking it 16th in the nation.

On October 14, 2004, the university added  in an attempt to create the largest research park inside the Washington, D.C., Capital Beltway, formerly known as "M Square," and now known as the "Discovery District".

Many of the faculty members have funding from federal agencies such as the National Science Foundation, the National Institutes of Health,
NASA, the Department of Homeland Security, the National Institute of Standards and Technology, and the National Security Agency. These relationships have created numerous research opportunities for the university, including:
 Taking the lead in the nationwide research initiative into the transmission and prevention of human and avian influenza.
 Creating a new research center to study the behavioral and social foundations of terrorism with funding from the U.S. Department of Homeland Security
 Launching the joint NASA-University of Maryland Deep Impact spacecraft in early January 2005.

The University of Maryland Libraries provide access to scholarly information resources required to meet the missions of the university.

The University of Maryland is an international center for the study of language, hosting the largest community of language scientists in North America, including more than 200 faculty, researchers, and graduate students, who collectively comprise the Maryland Language Science Center under the leadership of Professor Colin Phillips. Since 2008 the university has hosted an NSF-IGERT interdisciplinary graduate training program that has catalyzed broader integrative efforts in language science, with 50 participating students and contributions from 50 faculty. The University of Maryland is also home to two key 'migrator' centers that connect basic research to critical national needs in education and national security: the Center for Advanced Study of Language (CASL) and the National Foreign Language Center (NFLC).

The Center for American Politics and Citizenship provides citizens and policy-makers with research on issues related to the United States' political institutions, processes, and policies. CAPC is a non-partisan, non-profit research institution within the Department of Government and Politics in the College of Behavioral and Social Sciences.

The Space Systems Laboratory researches human-robotic interaction for astronautics applications and includes the only neutral buoyancy facility at a university.

The Joint Quantum Institute conducts theoretical and experimental quantum and atomic physics research. The institute was founded in 2006 as a collaboration between the University of Maryland and the National Institute of Standards and Technology (NIST).

The Center for Technology and Systems Management (CTSM) aims to advance the state of technology and systems analysis for the benefit of people and the environment. The focus is on enhancing safety, efficiency, and effectiveness by performing reliability, risk, uncertainty, or decision analysis studies.

The Joint Global Change Research Institute was formed in 2001 by the University of Maryland and the Pacific Northwest National Laboratory. The institute focuses on multidisciplinary approaches to climate change research.

The Center for Advanced Life Cycle Engineering (CALCE) was formed in 1985 at the University of Maryland. CALCE is dedicated to providing a knowledge and resource base to support the development of electronic components, products, and systems.

The National Consortium for the Study of Terrorism and Responses to Terrorism (START) launched in 2005 as one of the Centers of Excellence supported by the Department of Homeland Security in the United States. START is focused on the scientific study of the causes and consequences of terrorism in the United States and worldwide.

Admissions

Undergraduate 

Admission to Maryland is rated "most selective" by U.S. News & World Report. For the Class of 2026 (enrolled fall 2022), Maryland received 56,766 applications and accepted 19.451 (34.3%). Of those accepted, 4,742 enrolled, a yield rate (the percentage of accepted students who choose to attend the university) of 24.4%. Maryland's freshman retention rate is 95.5%, with 88.3% going on to graduate within six years.

Of the 34% of the incoming freshman class who submitted SAT scores; the middle 50 percent Composite scores were 1340-1490. Of the 9% of enrolled freshmen in 2021 who submitted ACT scores; the middle 50 percent Composite score was between 30 and 34. 

The University of Maryland, College Park is a college-sponsor of the National Merit Scholarship Program and sponsored 58 Merit Scholarship awards in 2020. In the 2020–2021 academic year, 69 freshman students were National Merit Scholars.

In 2020, the university announced it was joining the Common App. Beginning with the 2017-18 admissions cycle, the University of Maryland uses the application provided by The Coalition for Access, Affordability, and Success, joining over 130 top public and private universities using the platform to streamline the college application process. Starting in August 2018, the University of Maryland began waiving the college application fee for U.S. military veterans and current service members. According to The Washington Post in 2017, the University of Maryland has become more selective with admissions in recent decades as it has risen in prestige, at the time being the ninth most selective public flagship university in the nation. From 2026, the University of Maryland will make gender X option available on forms and documents alongside male and female options for student enrollment - as announced in May 2022.

Rankings

The university is tied for 55th in the 2022 U.S. News & World Report rankings of "National Universities" across the United States, and it is ranked tied for 19th nationally among public universities. 
The Academic Ranking of World Universities ranked Maryland as 43rd in the world in 2015. The 2017–2018 Times Higher Education World University Rankings placed Maryland 69th worldwide. The 2016/17 QS World University Rankings ranked Maryland 131st worldwide.

The university was ranked among Peace Corps' 25 Top Volunteer-Producing Colleges for the tenth consecutive year in 2020. The University of Maryland is ranked among Teach for America's Top 20 Colleges and Universities, contributing the greatest number of graduating seniors to its 2017 teaching corps. Kiplinger's Personal Finance ranked the University 10th for in-state students and 16th for out-of-state students in its 2019 Best College Value ranking. Money Magazine ranked the university 1st in the state of Maryland for public colleges in its 2019 Best College for Your Money ranking.

For the fourth consecutive year in 2015, the university was ranked 1st in the U.S. for the number of Boren Scholarship recipients – with nine students receiving awards for intensive international language study. The university is ranked as a Top Producing Institution of Fulbright U.S. Students and Scholars for the 2017–2018 academic year by the United States Department of State's Bureau of Educational and Cultural Affairs.

In 2017, the University of Maryland was ranked among the top 50 universities in the 2018 Best Global Universities Rankings by U.S. News & World Report based on its high academic research performance and global reputation.

In 2021, the university was ranked among the top 10 universities in The Princeton Reviews annual survey of the Top Schools for Innovation & Entrepreneurship; this was the sixth consecutive such ranking. The Master of Engineering in Robotics program and the Graduate Certificate in Engineering program within the A. James Clark School of Engineering received endorsements from the Advanced Robotics for Manufacturing Institute.

Campus

The university's campus is noted for its red-brick Georgian buildings and its large central lawn, named McKeldin Mall and nicknamed "The Mall", which is the largest academic mall in the United States. White columns decorate many buildings, with around 770 columns on campus. Spanning the university's  are 7,500 documented trees and garden plantings, leading the American Public Gardens Association to designate the campus the University of Maryland Arboretum & Botanical Garden in 2008. The designation has allowed the university to showcase species and gardens, including native plantings. There are arboretum tours, such as the centralized Tree Walking Tour, which is based around McKeldin Mall and features 56 specimen trees.

The recreational Paint Branch Trail, part of the Anacostia Tributary Trails system, cuts through campus, as does the Paint Branch stream, a tributary of the Northeast Branch Anacostia River.

McKeldin Mall serves as the center of campus. On the east and west of McKeldin Mall lie the Thomas V. Miller, Jr. Administration Building and McKeldin Library. Academic buildings surround McKeldin Mall on the north and south ends. They are the homes to many departments in the College of Behavioral and Social Sciences, College of Arts and Humanities, and the College of Agriculture and Natural Resources. West of McKeldin Mall is the North Hill Community, and south of McKeldin Mall lies Morrill Hall and the Morrill Quad, which was the original center of campus. South of the Morrill Quad are the South Hill and South Campus Commons Communities, and the Southwest Mall and the Robert H. Smith School of Business to the southwest. Running parallel to McKeldin Mall to the north is Campus Drive, the main thoroughfare through campus.

The Adele H. Stamp Student Union sits along Campus Drive near the center of campus. It serves as a transit center for the campus, where Shuttle-UM (the university's bus service) and municipal buses pick up and drop off passengers. Hornbake Plaza, home to Hornbake Library and several buildings housing academic departments, also lies on Campus Drive, east of Stamp. Stamp serves as a center that includes a food court, bowling alley, book store, and spaces made available for major events, such as first-year orientation and career fairs.

Outside the Stamp Student Union on Campus Drive is the Jim Henson Statue and Memorial Garden, in honor of the late Jim Henson, a Maryland alumnus. A likeness of Henson is seated on a park bench, facing arguably his most famous creation, Kermit the Frog. To the north and northwest of Stamp and Hornbake Plaza are the North Campus communities, Maryland Stadium, the Eppley Recreation Center (the main gym on campus), the XFINITY Center, and the Wooded Hillock, a  forest next to the XFINITY Center; Stadium Drive runs between the more southern Maryland Stadium and the rest of these. The Clarice Smith Performing Arts Center sits west of Maryland Stadium.

Another thoroughfare, Regents Drive, runs perpendicular to McKeldin Mall and is home to the Memorial Chapel and the Campus Farms. Regents Drive crosses Campus Drive at the campus hallmark, "M" Circle, which is a traffic circle with a large "M" formed by flowers in its center. The northeast quadrant of campus, formed by Campus and Regent Drives, is home to many of natural sciences and applied sciences departments.

The university is also divided by U.S. Route 1, known locally as "Baltimore Avenue." While most of the campus lies to the west of Baltimore Avenue, fixtures such as Fraternity Row and the Leonardtown Communities lie to the east. Sitting on the western edge of Baltimore Avenue are the Visitors' Center, also known as The Dairy, The Reckord Armory, and The Rossborough Inn, which, built during the years 1798 to 1812, is the oldest building on campus (and is older than the university itself). There are five regularly used entrances to campus; the main entrance, off of Baltimore Avenue and onto Campus Drive, is referred to as North Gate and features the Gatehouse, an ornate gateway honoring the university's founders. The , 18-hole University of Maryland Golf Course sits at the northern edge of campus, as does the Observatory. The campus is also home to one of the root servers, responsible for operating the Domain Name System (DNS).

Sustainability

The four-person Office of Sustainability was created in the summer of 2007 after University President Dan Mote became a charter signatory of the American College and Universities Presidents Climate Commitment (ACUPCC) with the goal of campus climate neutrality. The Climate Action Plan Work Group completed an inventory of campus emissions from 2002 to 2007 and finalized a Climate Action Plan in August 2009. According to the university's Climate Action Plan, Maryland aims to become carbon neutral by 2050. All new constructions and major renovations must satisfy LEED-Silver certification requirements. The office has promoted several initiatives, including an increase in the campus recycling rate from 17% in 2003 to 89% in 2014. In 2008, the recycling rate rose from 37% to a 54% due in part to the "Feed the Turtle" program for home football games. Although recycling rates have increased across campus, not every bin is able to be recycled due to high contamination rates on some parts of campus. For example, as of 2017, the Stamp Student Union had 54% contamination rates in their recycling bins, which means over half of the waste in the recycling bins at Stamp had to be thrown into the trash. Power Shift, a national youth climate activism summit, was held at the University of Maryland in November 2007 with 6,000 individuals in attendance.

The university's first Leed Gold building, Knight Hall, opened in April 2010 as the new home for the Philip Merrill College of Journalism. The university added solar panels in the spring of 2010 to the roof of "The Diner" dining hall in North Campus, and plans to add solar panels to the roof of Cole Field House, as well as additional campus buildings. The university's announced  state-of-the-art Physical Sciences Complex (set to be completed in July 2013) will meet LEED-Silver certification requirements.

In 2008, the Office of Sustainability started the Sustainability Advisors program, where teachers invited a peer educator to lecture on sustainability concepts.

The Office of Sustainability began an initiative called "The Chesapeake Project" in 2009, in which professors integrate sustainability education into pre-existing classes across every discipline. Participating professors attend a two-day workshop in late May to learn about environmental, economic, and social sustainability. All participants receive a $500 stipend. By the end of summer, workshop participants submit a revised course plan for at least one course offered the following academic year. Since the inaugural workshop in 2009, 71 professors have participated in the program, implementing sustainability education into over 80 courses across all 12 colleges at the school.

In 2003, bioretention facilities were installed on the campus with collaboration from the Prince George's County Department of Environmental Resources. Since then, research has continued on the effectiveness of these bioretention sites in controlling water flow and filtering pollutants. A prime example is the research of Professor Allen Davis in the Department of Civil and Environmental Engineering, which has examined and improved upon the removal of contaminants with rain gardens.

In 2010, the University System of Maryland and the Department of General Services began three twenty-year projects. The three projects included: a solar project in Mount St. Mary's University, a wind project in Western Maryland, and another wind project in West Virginia. The first of these projects, the solar project, is a 16-megawatt project. The first wind project is 10 megawatts, and the second is 55 megawatts.

The projects will allow the university to receive 15 percent of its purchased energy from these renewable energy resources. Also, in 2010, Ellicott Dining Hall installed solar panels which would provide up to 30 percent of the energy for heating its water. The university installed 20 panels with three solar storage tanks, pumps, temperature sensors, and controls. The system will increasingly provide more of the dining hall's water needs.

In 2011, Maryland's team won the Solar Decathlon, a competition put on by the U.S. Department of Energy. The team designed and built a solar-powered home with a split butterfly roof in a project called "WaterShed." The house was "inspired and guided by the Chesapeake Bay ecosystem, interconnecting the house with its landscape and leading its dwellers toward a more sustainable lifestyle." Over 200 students contributed to the project. Maryland's design beat out submissions from 20 other universities from all over the world, including China, New Zealand, Belgium, and Canada.

In the 2017 Solar Decathlon, the University of Maryland's team won 1st place in the U.S. and 2nd place worldwide. The 100% solar powered house, named "resilient Adaptive Climate Technology" (reACT), was largely inspired by the environmentally conscious traditions of the Nanticoke people and other local Native American tribes in Maryland, such as water reuse, home gardening, and composting.

Maryland also promotes the use of reusable to-go containers at the dining hall, or OZZI containers, since the official launching of the program in August 2011. Students pay a $5 fee to initially use the container, but receive a coin when they return it to the dispenser. With the coin, the use of the container is cost-free.

In January 2011, Maryland installed occupancy sensors in nearly 300 general-purpose classrooms. These occupancy sensors automatically turn off the lights after 30 minutes if there is no motion in a room. The project is estimated to cut energy consumption by 30 percent and save the university $100,000 annually.

In 2012, the University Sustainability fund granted $130,000 to projects that promote sustainability. The money was generated from an $8 mandatory sustainability fee, a fee that will increase to $12 by 2014. Mark Stewart, Project Manager at the Office of Sustainability, expects the fund to grow to $300,000 by 2013.

On May 2, 2012, the Wellness Coalition hosted its first Farmers Market at Maryland, a weekly tradition that supplies produce from farms in Maryland, Pennsylvania, and Virginia. Its first day saw over 1,000 visitors.

In October 2013, the university's College of Behavioral and Social Sciences (BSOS) became its first college to form its own Sustainability Task Force. In April 2014, the Task Force produced BSOS's Sustainability Plan to advance campus sustainability and complement the university's Climate Action Plan to help the university become a national model of a green university. It is the first plan of its kind at the college level at the university and was designed to serve as a guide for other colleges to join BSOS in this effort to improve the sustainability of the campus and community as a whole. In September 2014 the BSOS Sustainability Task Force expanded to include a student Sustainability Task Force. The student Task Force is an interdisciplinary team focused on addressing sustainability problems on campus.

In August 2015, compost bins were placed in two residence halls and, after a successful year, were placed in nine other halls in August 2016. As of 2017, the University of Maryland increased its compost collection by nearly 450% since 2010. While efforts have been made to add composting collection sites on campus in academic buildings and residence halls, many have been removed due to high contamination rates. Some Greek life houses and on-campus apartment buildings used to have composting, but in 2017 and 2018, many had to be removed since they were causing more harm than good.

In 2021, President Pines pledged that the University of Maryland would achieve carbon neutrality by Earth Day 2025, 25 years sooner than the goal announced in 2009.

Student life

Residential life

There are two main residential areas on campus, North Campus and South Campus, further divided into seven residential communities. North Campus is made up of Cambridge Community (which consists of five residence halls and houses the College Park Scholars program), Denton Community (which currently consists of four halls, including Oakland hall, which opened in the fall semester of 2011), and Ellicott Community (consisting of three halls). The new Heritage community features two new halls for students (Pyon-Chen Hall and Johnson-Whittle Hall) and a new dining hall.  Pyon-Chen opened in 2021 and Johnson-Whittle opened in 2022.

South Campus includes the North Hill Community, made up of nine Georgian-style halls and Prince Frederick hall (which opened in the fall semester of 2014) immediately west of McKeldin Mall, South Hill Community, made up of fourteen small residence halls for upper-level students, Leonardtown Community, which offers apartment-style living and is further divided into Old Leonardtown (consisting of six buildings) and New Leonardtown (also composed of six buildings), the South Campus Commons Community, which consists of seven apartment-style buildings (the seventh and most recent building being opened in January 2010), and the Courtyards, a garden-style apartment community in north campus consisting of seven buildings.

The South Campus Commons Community and Courtyards, while built on campus, are managed by a private company, Capstone On-Campus Management, as part of a public-private partnership between the company and the University of Maryland.

The university does not have family housing. As of 2011, some students with families have advocated for the addition of family housing.

Residential life is overseen by the Department of Resident Life, which consists of staff members and departments. For instance, resident assistants, who are full-time undergraduates facilitating the student interaction and development of floors within their assigned floor, building, or community, are supervised by resident directors. The Department of Resident Life offers its residents and other students many programs, including the Math Success Program, Academic Success Program, Common Ground Dialogue Program, and many Living and Learning programs.

Dining
There are four dining halls on campus: the North Campus Dining Hall ("The Diner") is between the Ellicott Community, the South Campus Dining Hall is near the South Hill and South Campus Commons communities,  the 251 North Dining Hall is in the Denton Community, and Yahentamitsi Dining Hall is in the Heritage Community. As of the fall of 2016, the University of Maryland Dining Services changed its dining plan from a pay-a-la-carte to an all-you-can-eat style dining experience. A food court in the Stamp Student Union provides many dining options for the university community. The Maryland Food Collective, popularly known as the Co-Op, is a worker-owned collective that has been providing a wide array of vegan and vegetarian food options, along with local, organic, and fair-trade fruits and vegetables since 1975, until its closing in 2019. The university's new dining hall on north campus, Yahentamitsi, which means "a place to go eat" in the Algonquin language spoken by the Piscataway people, is the first building on campus named in honor of Indigenous people.

Transportation
 The university is accessible through the three airports in the greater Washington metropolitan area: Ronald Reagan Washington National Airport, Washington Dulles International Airport, and Baltimore/Washington International Thurgood Marshall Airport. A small public airport in College Park, College Park Airport, lies nearly adjacent to campus, but operations are limited to the Washington metropolitan area. The College Park Airport is the world's oldest continually operating airport and the site of many significant aviation firsts.

A free shuttle service, known as Shuttle–UM, is available for UMD students, faculty, staff, and some residents of College Park and Greenbelt. The university is served by an off-campus stop on the Washington Metro Green Line and Yellow Line called College Park – University of Maryland. The station is also served by the Camden Line of the MARC Train, which runs between Baltimore and Washington. A Shuttle-UM bus (Route 104) arrives at the station every five minutes during the fall and spring semesters (every ten minutes during the summer) to bring visitors to campus (stopping in front of the Stamp Student Union).

Metrobus and Prince George's County TheBus bus services also stop on campus. Since 2012, TheBus services for Route1Ride (Route 17) are free of charge to all University of Maryland students and staff, providing service on Route 1 from the Washington, D.C. border to the IKEA in College Park, with a stop at the College Park – University of Maryland Metro station. There is an additional service called Nite Ride, which is a curb-to-curb service offered every night from 5:30 p.m. to 7:30 a.m. The service is designed to serve the areas of campus that are not on the evening service routes.

Over 21,000 parking spaces are on campus, in parking lots and garages. There are 16 electric vehicle charging stations on campus in 7 locations that are free and open to the public, with plans to add more stations. Zipcar service is also available on campus for all UMD students, faculty, and staff.

The university has attempted to make the campus more bike-friendly by installing covered bike parking and bike lockers on campus, introducing a bike-sharing program, and plans to add more bike lanes on campus. As of Spring 2011, the university has encouraged cycling on campus by installing covered bike storage outside of the newly built Oakland dorm as well as security lockers in the Mowatt Lane Garage. In addition to increased storage options, the university runs the Campus Bike Shop where students can get their bikes repaired and learn how to maintain them on their own. Since 2014, the University of Maryland has been named a gold-level "Bicycle Friendly University" by the League of American Bicyclists.

As of Fall 2019, electric scooter stations were placed around campus to facilitate the introduction of an electric scooter, e-bike, and manual bike sharing system on campus. Over the semester, private scooter companies introduced and slowly increased the number of scooters and bikes available for rental on campus. All the bikes and scooters for pay-by-the-minute rental are only available between 5:00 am and 9:00 pm each day. Over the Fall 2019 semester, personal scooters have also drastically increased on campus.
  
Under the administration of former President C. Daniel Mote Jr., the university was the primary source of opposition in Prince George's County to the installation of one or more light-rail stops on campus as a part of the proposed Maryland Transit Administration's Purple Line out of concern for student safety and to protect sensitive lab equipment. This sentiment was similar to previous transit positions taken by the university in the 1980s, specifically when the administration rejected Metro's first proposal of having the College Park–University of Maryland station run underground through campus connecting to Adele H. Stamp Student Union, and strongly opposed their second proposal to put the stop right next to campus in downtown College Park on Route 1, with the reasoning to protect student and resident safety.

In 2017, former Maryland Governor and Prince George's County Executive Parris Glendening admitted the university's decision to have the Metro station as far away from campus as possible (1.6 miles) was a "disaster" and racially biased, primarily due to administrators and community residents saying they did not want crime or undesirable people coming to campus on the Green Line from the poorer neighborhoods of Washington.

Under President Wallace Loh's vision in 2011, the administration recognized the transit mistakes of the past and embraced having the Purple Line on campus as it would drastically increase transportation access for students and faculty, while encouraging more walkable transit-oriented developments in downtown College Park. The Purple Line route, which is expected to be completed in the fall of 2022, will have five stops on and around the university's campus: M Square, the College Park Metro station, the main entrance to the campus on Route 1, near Stamp Student Union on Campus Drive, and on the other edge of campus on Adelphi Road, along with a parallel running bike path.

The Diamondback

The Diamondback is an independent student newspaper. It was founded in 1910 as The Triangle and renamed in 1921 in honor of a local reptile, the Diamondback terrapin, which became the school mascot in 1933. The newspaper is published daily, Monday through Friday, during the spring and fall semesters, with a print circulation of 17,000 and annual advertising revenues of over $1 million. It has four sections: News, Opinion, Sports, and Diversions.

For the 2008–2009 school year, The Diamondback earned a Mark of Excellence award from the Society of Professional Journalists, placing second nationally for Best All-Around Daily Student Newspaper and first in its region in the same category. Three years earlier the newspaper had finished third place nationally for Best All-Around Daily Student Newspaper and first in its region.

Notable journalists who have been with the paper include David Simon of HBO's The Wire and NBC's Homicide: Life on the Street; disgraced Jayson Blair, who was editor-in-chief in 1996 (he did not graduate, instead taking a job with The New York Times); Norman Chad, who was editor-in-chief in 1978; cartoonists Jeff Kinney, who created the Diary of a Wimpy Kid fiction series and whose Igdoof strip appeared in The Diamondback; Aaron McGruder, who first published his cartoon The Boondocks in The Diamondback; and Frank Cho, who began his career with the popular University Squared for The Diamondback.

WMUC-FM

WMUC-FM (90.5 FM) is the university's non-commercial radio station, staffed by UMD students and volunteers. WMUC is a freeform radio station broadcast at 10 watts. Its broadcasts can be heard throughout the Washington metropolitan area. Notable WMUC alumni include Connie Chung, Bonnie Bernstein, Peter Rosenberg and Aaron McGruder.

WMUC Sports
WMUC Sports is the online sports division of WMUC-FM that provides live broadcasts for over 10 Division I University of Maryland sports, including the Terrapin football and basketball teams.

Greek life

Approximately 15% of men and 20% of women in Maryland's undergraduate student body are involved in Greek life. Many of the fraternities and sororities at the school are on Fraternity Row and the Graham Cracker, which are controlled by the university. Fraternity Row is the background of several recently produced films.

All social Greek organizations are governed by one of five groups: the Inter-Fraternity Council (IFC), the Panhellenic Association (PHA), the Pan-Hellenic Council, the United Greek Council, or the Professional Fraternal Association. The United Greek Council governs all cultural Greek organizations. These councils assist in the creation and governance of chapter by-laws, risk management plans, and philanthropic activities, with support from the Department of Fraternity and Sorority Life (DFSL). Each year, every Greek organization must fulfill certain requirements, including doing a service and conducting a program/event related to community service, diversity, or alumni and faculty outreach.

A cappella groups 
UMD hosts ten student-run a cappella groups on campus, several of which regularly compete in the International Championship of Collegiate A Cappella (ICCA). The most prominent of these groups is the mixed ensemble Faux Paz, who placed 3rd at ICCA finals in New York City in 2016 and 1st in the 2021 virtual tournament. In 2020, The A Cappella Archive ranked Faux Paz at #10 out of all ICCA-competing groups.

Athletics

The university sponsors varsity athletic teams in 20 men's and women's sports. The teams, named the "Terrapins," represent Maryland in National Collegiate Athletic Association Division I competition. Maryland became a founding member of the Atlantic Coast Conference in 1952 but left to join the Big Ten Conference on July 1, 2014. As of 2017, Maryland's athletic teams have been awarded 44 national championships by the NCAA, USILA, AIAW, and NCA. In 2008 and 2010, The Princeton Review named the University of Maryland's athletic facilities the best in the nation. The Terrapins nickname (often shortened to "Terps") was coined by former university president, football coach, and athletic director H. C. "Curly" Byrd in 1932. The mascot is a diamondback terrapin named Testudo, which is Latin for "tortoise." Since the early 20th century, the school athletic colors have been some combination of those on the Maryland state flag: red, white, black, and gold. Maryland is the only NCAA Division I school to have four official school colors.

Men's basketball 

Men's basketball is the most popular sport at the university. Long-time head coach Lefty Driesell began the now nationwide tradition of "Midnight Madness" in 1971. Beginning in 1989, alumnus Gary Williams revived the program, which was struggling in the wake of Len Bias's death and NCAA rules infractions. Williams led Maryland basketball to national prominence with two Final Four appearances, and in 2002, a national championship. On February 7, 2006, Williams won his 349th game to surpass Driesell and became Maryland's all-time leader among basketball coaches. In May 2011, Williams retired as head coach, which allowed for the entrance of the new head coach, Mark Turgeon. The court at XFINITY Center was named in honor of the beloved coach, Gary Williams. Maryland football is also popular at the university. The Terrapins were awarded the national championship by the wire services in 1953, and in 1951, by several retroactive selectors.

Women's basketball 

Women's basketball has become one of the most celebrated sports on campus, due to significant success in the Brenda Frese era. After experiencing a period of national prominence under head coach, Chris Weller in the 1980s, including a pair of trips to the Final Four in 1982 and 1989, the Maryland Terrapins reached their full potential in 2006, winning the NCAA national championship. In the ACC, Maryland was regularly a threat to win regular season and conference tournament championships, doing so on five and ten occasions, respectively. Since joining the Big Ten in the 2014–2015 season, Maryland has featured in every Big Ten Tournament Championship game (as of 2021), winning five titles, and has won six of seven regular season championships.

Men's lacrosse 

Maryland men's lacrosse remains one of the sport's top programs since its beginnings as a squad in 1865. The team most recently won the national championship in 2022, completing an undefeated season, the first since Virginia in 2006, and the first to go undefeated across 18 games. The team has won ten USILA and NCAA national championships since its promotion to varsity status in 1924 and is a regular fixture in the NCAA tournament.

Women's lacrosse 
The Maryland women's lacrosse team has won 15 national championships, the most of any program in the nation. The team has produced the National Player of the Year/Tewaaraton Award winner eight times, more than any other collegiate program. The Terrapins have also made the most NCAA tournament appearances, won the most tournament games, and made the most NCAA championship game appearances of any program. They most recently won the NCAA championship in 2019.

Men's soccer 
The men's soccer team has won four NCAA Division I College Cup national championships, most recently in 2018. Under the guidance of head coach Sasho Cirovski, the soccer team has reached nine Final Fours and won three College Cups since 1997. The soccer team has developed a large, devoted fan base among students and the local community. The attendance record at Ludwig Field was set in 2015 when 8,449 fans saw Maryland win over top-ranked UCLA in extra time. The annual total attendance increased dramatically from 12,710 in 1995 to 35,631 in 2008.

Field hockey 
The Maryland women's field hockey team is among the most accomplished field hockey programs in the country, and have won a total of eight NCAA national championships and 13 conference championships (10 in the ACC and 5 in the Big Ten).

Band During Sports 
The Mighty Sound of Maryland marching band attends all home football games and provides pre-game performances. During basketball season, the marching band becomes the University of Maryland Pep Band, which provides music in the stands at men's and women's home games and during tournament play.

On July 1, 2012, the university cut seven varsity teams: men's cross country, men's indoor track, men's swimming and diving, men's tennis, women's acrobatics and tumbling, women's swimming and diving, and women's water polo. The men's outdoor track team had been scheduled to be cut, but the team raised $888,000 of a target amount of $940,000, sufficient to avoid elimination.

Mascot

In 1932, Curley Byrd—who served as the university's football and baseball coach, athletic director, and president—proposed adopting the diamondback terrapin as a mascot. The first statue of Testudo cast in bronze was donated by the Class of 1933 and displayed on Baltimore Avenue in front of Ritchie Coliseum. However, the 300-pound sculpture was subjected to vandalism by visiting college athletic teams. One such incident occurred in 1947 when students from Johns Hopkins University stole the bronze statue and moved it to their campus. Maryland students traveled to Baltimore to retrieve it, laying siege to the house where it was hidden. Over 200 city police responded to quell the riot. In 1949, University President Byrd was awakened by a phone call from a University of Virginia fraternity requesting Testudo be removed from their lawn. Testudo was later filled with 700 pounds of cement and fastened to his pedestal to prevent future removals, but students at rival schools continued to vandalize it. It was moved to Maryland Stadium in 1951. In the 1960s, Testudo was moved back to a central spot in front of McKeldin Library.

In 1992 a duplicate statue was placed at Maryland Stadium, where the football team touches it for good luck as they pass by before games. Additional Testudo statues now sit outside of the Gossett Team House near the stadium; XFINITY Center, the school's basketball arena; the Riggs Alumni Center; in the lobby of the Adele H. Stamp Student Union; and on the courtyard of Van Munching Hall. In 1994, the Maryland General Assembly approved legislation to name the diamondback terrapin (malaclemys terrapin terrapin) as the official state reptile and the legally codified mascot of the University of Maryland. Beginning in the 2000s, the university promoted the slogan "Fear the Turtle" as a rallying cry for school pride.

The statue's nose is polished by passers-by that have rubbed it for good luck. Around finals week, students start giving offerings to Testudo in the hope of good grades. In 2013, the Testudo statue caught fire because of an ill-advised mixture of offerings and a lit candle. Local news channels reported about this event and it trended on Twitter. During the COVID-19 pandemic, campus guidelines included instructions to not rub the statue's nose unless using disinfectant wipes before and after to clean it.

Notable alumni

Notable alumni include House Democratic Whip Steny Hoyer; Google co-founder Sergey Brin; The Muppets creator Jim Henson; The Wire creator David Simon, as well as Seinfeld co-creator and Curb Your Enthusiasm creator Larry David. Former NFL Quarterback Norman "Boomer" Esiason. Prominent alumni in business include Ed Snider, Chairman of Comcast Spectacor and owner of the Philadelphia Flyers; Jim Walton (journalist), former president and CEO of CNN; Kevin Plank, founder and executive chairman of the athletic apparel company Under Armour; Leonard Kevin "Len" Bias, a first team All-American college basketball forward; Chris Kubasik, former President of Lockheed Martin; Carly Fiorina, former CEO of Hewlett-Packard; and telecommunications entrepreneur Brian Hinman.

Journalist and news director Ed Godfrey graduated with a Bachelor of Arts in Public Relations and Journalism. Television personality Connie Chung; E! News reporter Giuliana Rancic graduated with a bachelor's degree from the Philip Merrill College of Journalism. ESPN reporters Bonnie Bernstein and Tim Kurkjian graduated from the Philip Merrill College of Journalism, as did Peter Rosenberg. Scott Van Pelt, also of ESPN, attended the Phillip Merrill College of Journalism but finished a few credits short of graduation.

Journalist Carl Bernstein, who won the Pulitzer Prize for Public Service for his coverage of the Watergate scandal, attended the university but did not graduate. Mark Rosenker, Former Chairman of the National Transportation Safety Board (NTSB) and now CBS NEWS Transportation Safety Analyst, graduated with a Bachelor of Arts in radio and television. Kiran Chetry, co-host of CNN's American Morning, graduated with a Bachelor of Arts in broadcast journalism. Jean Worthley of Maryland Public Television hosted Hodgepodge Lodge and co-hosted On Nature's Trail after enrolling in the Graduate School of Education. TV and media critic David Zurawik of The Baltimore Sun graduated with a doctorate in American Studies.

Heidi Collins of CNN Newsroom graduated with a Bachelor of Science. Former Maryland governor Harry R. Hughes also attended. Gayle King, editor-at-large for O, The Oprah Magazine, graduated from Maryland with a degree in psychology. Television show host Bruce DePuyt, host of News Talk on NewsChannel8, graduated from Phillip Merrill College of Journalism.

Attendees within the fields of science and mathematics are Nobel laureates Raymond Davis Jr., 2002 winner in Physics; Herbert Hauptman, 1985 winner in Chemistry, and Fields Medal winner Charles Fefferman. Other alumni include George Dantzig, considered the father of linear programming; late NASA astronaut Judith Resnik, who died in the destruction of the Space Shuttle Challenger during the launch of mission STS-51-L; engineer James S. Albus, founder of a division at the National Institute of Standards and Technology (NIST); NASA Administrator Michael D. Griffin; Sara Hallager, curator of birds at the Smithsonian's National Zoo; and Kevin Greenaugh, first African American to receive a doctorate in nuclear engineering from the University of Maryland.

Several donors have distinguished themselves for their sizable gifts to the university. Businessman Robert H. Smith, who graduated from the university in 1950 with a degree in accounting, has given over $45 million to the business school that now bears his name and to the Clarice Smith Performing Arts Center, which bears his wife's name. Construction entrepreneur A. James Clark, who graduated with an engineering degree in 1950, has also donated over $45 million to the college of engineering, which also bears his name. Another engineering donor, Jeong H. Kim, earned his Ph.D. from the university in 1991 and gave $5 million for the construction of a state-of-the-art engineering building. Philip Merrill, a media figure, donated $10 million to the College of Journalism. Robert E. Fischell, physicist, inventor, and holder of more than 200 U.S. and foreign medical patents donated $30 million to the A. James Clark School of Engineering, establishing the Fischell Department of Bioengineering. Brendan Iribe, a co-founder of Oculus VR, donated $31 million to the university in 2014 towards a new computer science building and scholarships.

In addition, the university has a number of executive trustees who are elected and have a diverse array of professional backgrounds.

Filmography
The university's campus has been featured in numerous films, television shows, and music videos, including:
 Young Sheldon (2021)
Veep (2014)
Savage U (2012) 
 Logic ("All I Do" and "The Spotlight") (2011, 2012)
 Naked Science (Earth's Invisible Shield) (2008)
 National Treasure: Book of Secrets (2007)
 CEO Exchange (2006)
 Naked Science (Earth's Core) (2005)
Tragedy to Triumph: The Maryland Terrapin Odyssey (2003)
 Species II (1998)
 Antiques Roadshow (College Park, Maryland) (1997)
 Hootie & the Blowfish ("Only Wanna Be with You") (1995)
 Life 101 (1995)
 The X-Files ("Lazarus") (1993)
 St. Elmo's Fire (1985)
 The House on Sorority Row (1983)

See also

 Shuping Yang commencement speech controversy
 Monroe H. Martin Prize

Notes

References

External links
 
 
 Maryland Athletics website
 
 Fear the Turtle Project collection at the University of Maryland Libraries

 
College Park, University of Maryland
University of Maryland, College Park
University of Maryland, College Park
Flagship universities in the United States
Land-grant universities and colleges
University of Maryland College
Educational institutions established in 1856
1856 establishments in Maryland